Zulfairuuz Rudy is a Singaporean football player. He plays currently for Tampines Rovers in the S.League .

Club career

Young Lions
He start his career with the Young Lions FC and played 1 game for them.

Home United
After leaving the Young Lions, he moved to the Home United Academy and was promoted to the 1st team in 2015.  He started playing regularly in 2016 in the Cups Games.

Hougang United
In 2017, he joined his former coach, Philippe Aw in Hougang United. He will be Hougang United's third goalkeeper.

International career
In March 2015, he was called up to the Singapore U22 squad that travelled to Laos to compete in the Asian Football Confederation (AFC) U23 Championship 2016 Qualifiers, and impressed in the 0-0 opener against Laos U22 .

References

1994 births
Living people
Singaporean footballers
Singapore Premier League players
Association football goalkeepers
Home United FC players
Hougang United FC players